Takanori Tōme (當銘 孝仁, Tōme Takanori, born 21 December 1992) is a Japanese canoeist. He competed in the men's C-1 1000 metres event at the 2020 Summer Olympics.

Career
In August 2018, Tōme represented Japan at the 2018 Asian Games in the men's C-2 1000 metres event. He also represented Japan at the 2017 and 2019 ICF Canoe Sprint World Championships.

Tome represented Japan at the 2020 Summer Olympics in the men's C-2 1000 metres event.

References

1992 births
Living people
Japanese male canoeists
Olympic canoeists of Japan
Canoeists at the 2018 Asian Games
Canoeists at the 2020 Summer Olympics
Place of birth missing (living people)